DreamCrew Entertainment is a Canadian production company co-founded by Drake and Adel "Future" Nur in 2017. It functions as both a management company and entertainment group. The company is best known for producing the HBO television series Euphoria and the Netflix series Top Boy.

Overview
In 2017, Drake and Adel "Future" Nur teamed up with LeBron James and Uninterrupted to produce the sports documentary The Carter Effect which discusses the impact of Vince Carter in Canada.

In 2019, Drake and Nur served as executive producers for the HBO teen drama series Euphoria and the revival of the British crime drama series Top Boy distributed by Netflix. Later in 2019, the co-founders produced the Showtime documentary Ready for War. In September 2019, DreamCrew filed a US trademark application for a design resembling to Health Canada's tetrahydrocannabinol (THC) warning label.

Drake and Nur served as executive producers on the dark comedy film Spree, released on January 24, 2020. In March 2020, it was announced that Drake will executive produce the Quibi adaptational series The 48 Laws of Power alongside Nur and Jason Shrier of DreamCrew, with Anonymous Content. In 2021, DreamCrew co-produced the HBO series Chillin Island created by Josh Safdie. The series featured guest appearances from artists including Young Thug, Lil Yachty, Rosalía, Gunna, Killer Mike, Coi Leray, and Vampire Weekend, among others.

Filmography

Films

Television

References

External links 
 Official website

2017 establishments in Ontario
Canadian companies established in 2017
Companies based in Toronto
Drake (musician)
Film production companies of Canada
Mass media companies established in 2017
Privately held companies of Canada
Television production companies of Canada